Household Name Records is a DIY punk rock record label, based in London, UK founded in 1996. It has been home to notable artists including Capdown, Howards Alias, Lightyear, and Adequate Seven.

Biography
Household Name Records was started in 1996 by David "Lil" Giles and Katherine "Kafren" Vik to promote unknown UK bands. Encouraged after successfully releasing their first compilation the team planned several more releases. To begin with the label focused on hardcore punk.

In May 2000, the label released Capdown's debut album Civil Disobedients. The album featured hardcore, but also mixed in ska and dub. According to Drowned in sound the album kick-started an underground punk scene. The album went on to be listed at 76 in the NME's top one hundred list for the decade.

The success of Capdown allowed the record label to diversify its roster with more experimental punk bands. In turn the label had a great impact on the UK punk scene.

Household Name Records artists

Current roster

 Billy No Mates
 Dissociates
 Chief
 The Cut Ups
 Great Cynics

Previous bands

 The 241ers
 Adequate Seven
 Antimaniax
 The Arteries
 Assert
 Belvedere
 Big D and the Kids Table
 Bombshell Rocks
 Brain Failure
 Breed 77
 Bullets To Broadway
 Canvas
 Capdown
 Captain Everything!
 Da Skywalkers
 Dead Inside
 Enemy Alliance
 Ensign
 Fig.4.0
 The Filaments
 Five Knuckle
 The Foamers
 Former Cell Mates
 Griswalds
 The Hard-Ons
 Hard Skin
 HHH
 Hostage Life
 Howards Alias
 Imbalance 
 Indecision
 John Holmes
 Kafka
 Kenisia
 The Kenmores
 The King Blues
 Knuckledust
 Leftöver Crack
 Lightyear
 Lockdown
 Loophole
 Medulla Nocte
 Milloy 
 Not Waving But Drowning
 One Fine Day
 The Peacocks
 The Planet Smashers
 Red Lights Flash
 Satanic Surfers
 Scraper
 Silencer 7
 Snap Her
 Special Move
 Spectreman
 Suicide Bid
 Taint
 The Take
 Thinktank
 This is a Standoff
 Two Cow Garage
 Vic Ruggiero
 Withdrawn
 Yeast
 Ye Wiles
 You Me and the Atom Bomb
 Zatopeks

References

External links
 Official site
 Household Name Records at Discogs
 Interview with Lasthours

British independent record labels
Underground punk scene in the United Kingdom
Punk record labels
Household Name Records
1996 establishments in the United Kingdom